Arto Tapio Blomsten (born March 16, 1965) is a Finnish-born Swedish former professional ice hockey defenceman. He was drafted in the twelfth round, 239th overall, by the Winnipeg Jets in the 1986 NHL Entry Draft. He played twenty-five games in the National Hockey League: nineteen with the Jets and six with the Los Angeles Kings. Born in Finland, Blomsten moved to Sweden when he was four years old.

Career statistics

Regular season and playoffs

International

References

External links

1965 births
Djurgårdens IF Hockey players
Frölunda HC players
Living people
Los Angeles Kings players
Moncton Hawks players
Phoenix Roadrunners (IHL) players
Sportspeople from Vaasa
Springfield Falcons players
Swedish ice hockey defencemen
Swedish people of Finnish descent
VIK Västerås HK players
Winnipeg Jets (1979–1996) draft picks
Winnipeg Jets (1979–1996) players